Dulab (also Romanized as Dūlāb) is a village in Qaleh Ganj Rural District, in the Central District of Qaleh Ganj County, Kerman Province, Iran. At the 2006 census, its population was 1,808, in 377 families.

References 

Populated places in Qaleh Ganj County